The Bourne Identity is a 2002 action-thriller film based on Robert Ludlum's 1980 novel. It was directed and co-produced by Doug Liman and written by Tony Gilroy and William Blake Herron. It stars Matt Damon as Jason Bourne, a man suffering from psychogenic amnesia attempting to discover his identity amidst a clandestine conspiracy within the CIA. It also features Franka Potente, Chris Cooper, Clive Owen, Brian Cox, Walton Goggins, and Adewale Akinnuoye-Agbaje. The first installment in the Bourne film series, it was followed by The Bourne Supremacy (2004), The Bourne Ultimatum (2007), The Bourne Legacy (2012), and Jason Bourne (2016).

Although Robert Ludlum died in 2001, he is credited as an executive producer alongside Frank Marshall. Universal Pictures released the film to theatres in the United States on June 14, 2002. The film opened to critical and commercial success, grossing $214 million on a $60 million budget.

Plot

In the Mediterranean Sea, Italian fishermen rescue an American man adrift with two gunshot wounds in his back. They tend to his wounds and find he has no memory of his identity, but demonstrates advanced combat skills and fluency in several languages. They find a laser projector under the man's hip that gives the number of a safe deposit box in Zürich, and the man decides to go investigate. He goes to the bank to investigate the deposit box where he finds various currencies, passports and IDs, and a handgun. The man takes everything but the gun, and starts using the name on the American passport, Jason Bourne. After Bourne's departure, a bank employee contacts Operation Treadstone, a CIA black ops program. Treadstone's head, Conklin, issues alerts to police to capture Bourne and assigns three agents to kill him: Castel, Manheim, and the Professor.

CIA Deputy Director Abbott contacts Conklin about a failed assassination attempt against exiled African dictator Wombosi, and Conklin promises that he will deal with the agent who failed. Bourne tries evading the Swiss police by using his U.S. passport to enter the American consulate, but is pursued by Marine guards. He escapes before offering $20,000 to Marie Kreutz, a 26-year-old German woman whom he saw at the consulate, to drive him to an address in Paris. Upon reaching the address, they enter an apartment where Bourne contacts a hotel through the phone. He inquires about the names on his passports there, learning that a "John Michael Kane" was registered but died two weeks prior in a car crash. Castel ambushes Bourne and Marie in the apartment, but Bourne gets the upper hand. Instead of allowing himself to be interrogated, Castel throws himself from a window to his death.

While searching through Castel's belongings, Marie finds wanted posters of Bourne and herself, and agrees to help him. After the two evade police in Marie's car, they spend the night in a Paris hotel. Meanwhile, Wombosi obsesses over the attempt on his life. Conklin, having anticipated this, planted a body to pose as John Michael Kane in a morgue to appear as the assailant, but Wombosi remains unconvinced and threatens to report the CIA’s actions to the media. The Professor then assassinates Wombosi on Conklin's orders. Bourne, posing as Kane, learns about the failed assassination attempt on Wombosi's yacht, and that the assassin was shot twice in the back during the escape, ultimately realizing that he was responsible for the attempt. Bourne and Marie take refuge at the French countryside home of Marie's friend Eamon and his children.

Under pressure from Abbott to handle the matter, Conklin tracks Bourne's location and sends the Professor to kill him. The Professor is mortally wounded by Bourne, and reveals their shared connection to Treadstone before dying. Bourne sends Marie, Eamon, and the children away for their protection, then contacts Conklin via the Professor's phone, and they agree to meet alone in Paris. When Bourne sees Conklin is not alone, he abandons their meeting, but manages to place a tracking device on Conklin's car, leading Bourne to Treadstone's safe house in Paris. Bourne breaks in and holds Conklin and logistics technician Nicky Parsons at gunpoint. Conklin reveals to Bourne his association with Treadstone and presses him to remember his past. Bourne recalls his attempt to assassinate Wombosi through successive flashbacks.

Under orders from Treadstone, Bourne infiltrated Wombosi's yacht as Kane and managed to get close enough to assassinate him. However, Bourne was unable to find the nerve to kill Wombosi while his children were present, and instead fled, being shot during his escape. Bourne announces he is resigning from Treadstone and warns Conklin not to follow him. As agents descend on the safe house, Bourne fights his way through. When Conklin leaves the safe house, he encounters Manheim, who kills him under Abbott's orders. Abbott then shuts down Treadstone. Abbott reports to an oversight committee that Treadstone is "decommissioned" before discussion turns to a new project codenamed "Blackbriar". Some time later, Bourne finds Marie renting out scooters to tourists on Mykonos, and the two reunite.

Cast

 Matt Damon as Jason Bourne
 Franka Potente as Marie Kreutz
 Chris Cooper as Alexander Conklin
 Clive Owen as The Professor
 Brian Cox as Ward Abbott
 Adewale Akinnuoye-Agbaje as Nykwana Wombosi
 Gabriel Mann as Danny Zorn
 Julia Stiles as Nicolette "Nicky" Parsons
 Orso Maria Guerrini as Giancarlo
 Tim Dutton as Eamon
 Nicky Naude as Castel
 Russell Levy as Manheim
 Vincent Franklin as Rawlins

Walton Goggins, Josh Hamilton, and Brian Huskey appear as Treadstone research technicians. David Bamber has a minor role as a clerk at the American consulate who denies Marie a student visa, David Gasman has one as the deputy chief of mission, and Hubert Saint-Macary as a Paris morgue director.

Production

Development
Director Doug Liman had been a fan of the source novel by Robert Ludlum since he read it in high school. Near the end of production of Liman's previous film Swingers, Liman decided to develop a film adaptation of the novel. After more than two years of securing rights to the book from Warner Bros. and a further year of screenplay development with screenwriter Tony Gilroy, the film went through two years of production. Universal Pictures acquired the film rights to Ludlum's books in the hopes of starting a new film franchise. William Blake Herron was brought in to rewrite the script in 1999.

Of particular inspiration were Liman's father Arthur Liman's memoirs regarding his involvement in the investigation of the Iran–Contra affair. Many aspects of the Alexander Conklin character were based on his father's recollections of Oliver North. Liman admitted that he jettisoned much of the content of the novel beyond the central premise, in order to modernize the material and to conform it to his own beliefs regarding United States foreign policy. However, Liman was careful not to cram his political views down "the audience's throat". There were initial concerns regarding the film's possible obsolescence and overall reception in the aftermath of the September 11 attacks, but these concerns proved groundless.

Casting
Liman approached a wide range of actors for the role of Bourne, including Brad Pitt, who turned it down to star in Spy Game, as well as Russell Crowe, Arnold Schwarzenegger, Tom Cruise and Sylvester Stallone, before he eventually cast Damon. Liman found that Damon understood and appreciated that, though The Bourne Identity would have its share of action, the focus was primarily on character and plot. Damon, who had never played such a physically demanding role, insisted on performing many of the stunts himself. With stunt choreographer Nick Powell, he underwent three months of extensive training in stunt work, the use of weapons, boxing, and the Filipino martial art  eskrima. He eventually performed a significant number of the film's stunts himself, including hand-to-hand combat and climbing the safe house walls near the film's conclusion.

Filming
Filming began in October 2000. From the onset of filming, difficulties with the studio slowed the film's development and caused a rift between the director and Universal Pictures, as executives were unhappy with the film's pacing, emphasis on small scale action sequences, and the general relationship between themselves and Liman, who was suspicious of direct studio involvement. A number of reshoots and rewrites late in development, plus scheduling problems, delayed the film from its original release target date of September 2001 to June 2002 and took it $8,000,000 over budget from the initial budget of $60 million; screenwriter Tony Gilroy faxed elements of screenplay rewrites almost throughout the entire duration of filming. A particular point of contention with regard to the original Gilroy script were the scenes set in the farmhouse near the film's conclusion. Liman and Matt Damon fought to keep the scenes in the film after they were excised in a third-act rewrite that was insisted upon by the studio. Liman and Damon argued that, though the scenes were low key, they were integral to the audience's understanding of the Bourne character and the film's central themes. The farmhouse sequence consequently went through many rewrites from its original incarnation before its inclusion in the final product.

Other issues included the studio's desire to substitute Montreal or Prague for Paris in order to lower costs, Liman's insistence on the use of a French-speaking film crew, and poor test audience reactions to the film's Paris finale. The latter required a late return to location in order to shoot a new, more action-oriented conclusion to the Paris story arc. In addition to Paris, filming took place in Prague, Imperia, Rome, Mykonos, and Zürich; several scenes set in Zürich were also filmed in Prague. Damon described the production as a struggle, citing the early conflicts that he and Liman had with the studio, but denied that it was an overtly difficult process, stating, "When I hear people saying that the production was a nightmare it's like, a 'nightmare'? Shooting's always hard, but we finished."

Liman's directorial method was often hands-on. Many times he operated the camera himself in order to create what he believed was a more intimate relationship between himself, the material, and the actors. He felt that this connection was lost if he simply observed the recording on a monitor. This was a mindset he developed from his background as a small-scale indie film maker.

The acclaimed car chase sequence was filmed primarily by the second unit under director Alexander Witt. The unit shot in various locations around Paris while Liman was filming the main story arc elsewhere in the city. The finished footage was eventually edited together to create the illusion of a coherent journey. Liman confessed that "anyone who really knows Paris will find it illogical", since few of the locations used in the car chase actually connect to each other. Liman took only a few of the shots himself; his most notable chase sequence shots were those of Matt Damon and Franka Potente while inside the car.

The consulate scenes were filmed in 2001 with real U.S. Marine Security Guards playing the roles of consulate guards.

Reception
On Metacritic, the film has a weighted average score of 68 out of 100 based on 38 critics, indicating "generally favorable reviews". Audiences polled by CinemaScore gave the film an average grade of "A−" on an A+ to F scale.

Roger Ebert of the Chicago Sun-Times gave the film three out of four stars and praised it for its ability to absorb the viewer in its "spycraft" and "Damon's ability to be focused and sincere" concluding that the film was "unnecessary, but not unskilled". Walter Chaw of Film Freak Central praised the film for its pacing and action sequences, describing them as "kinetic, fair, and intelligent, every payoff packaged with a moment's contemplation crucial to the creation of tension" and that the movie could be understood as a clever subversion of the genre. Charles Taylor of Salon.com acclaimed the film as "entertaining, handsome and gripping, The Bourne Identity is something of an anomaly among big-budget summer blockbusters: a thriller with some brains and feeling behind it, more attuned to story and character than to spectacle" and praised Liman for giving the film a "tough mindedness" that never gives way into "cynicism or hopelessness".

Ed Gonzalez of Slant Magazine also noted Doug Liman's "restrained approach to the material" as well as Matt Damon and Franka Potente's strong chemistry, but ultimately concluded the film was "smart, but not smart enough". J. Hoberman of The Village Voice dismissed the film as "banal" and as a disappointment compared against Liman's previous indie releases; Owen Gleiberman also criticised the film for a "sullen roteness that all of Liman's supple handheld staging can't disguise".
Aaron Beierle of DVDTalk gave particular praise to the film's central car chase which was described as an exciting action highlight and one of the best realized in the genre.

The Bourne Identity has been described by some authors as a neo-noir film.

Release
In its opening weekend, The Bourne Identity took in US$27,118,640 in 2,638 theaters, ranking at #2 behind fellow new release Scooby-Doo. The film grossed $121,661,683 in North America and $92,263,424 elsewhere for a total worldwide gross of $214,034,224.

Accolades

Home media
On January 21, 2003, Universal Pictures released The Bourne Identity in the U.S. on VHS as well as on a "collector’s edition" DVD in two formats: widescreen and full screen. It surpassed Harry Potter and the Sorcerer's Stone to have the highest DVD rentals, making $22.7 million. The film would hold this record for seven months until it was taken by The Lord of the Rings: The Two Towers in August of the same year. This DVD release contains supplemental materials including a making-of documentary, a commentary from director Doug Liman and deleted scenes. On July 13, 2004, Universal released a new "extended edition" DVD of the film in the U.S. in preparation for the sequel's cinema debut. This DVD came in the same two formats as the 2003 edition. The supplemental materials for this version include interviews with Matt Damon, deleted scenes, alternative opening and ending, a documentary on the consulate fight and information features on the CIA and amnesia. The alternate ending on the DVD has Bourne collapsing during the search for Marie, waking up with Abbott standing over him, and getting an offer to return to the CIA. Neither contain the commentary or DTS tracks present in the 2003 edition. The film was also released on UMD for Sony's PlayStation Portable on August 30, 2005 and on HD DVD on July 24, 2007. With the release of The Bourne Ultimatum on DVD, a reprint of the 2004 version was included in a boxed set with Supremacy and Ultimatum, entitled The Jason Bourne Collection. A trilogy set was released on Blu-ray in January 2009.

It was the top DVD video rental in the United States during the first quarter of 2003, earning  in US DVD rental revenue by March 2003.

Soundtrack

The score for The Bourne Identity was composed by John Powell. Powell was brought in to replace Carter Burwell, who had composed and recorded a more traditional orchestral score for the film, which director Doug Liman rejected. Since a lot of the music budget had been spent recording the rejected score, Powell's score was initially conceived to be entirely non-orchestral, making extensive use of percussion, guitars, electronics and studio techniques. However, a string section was later overdubbed onto many of the cues to give them a 'cinematic' quality.

The Bourne Identity: Original Motion Picture Soundtrack was released on June 11, 2002 by Varèse Sarabande. In addition to the score, the film also featured the songs "Extreme Ways" by Moby and "Ready Steady Go" by Paul Oakenfold. The soundtrack won an ASCAP Award.

Sequels

The Bourne Identity was followed by a 2004 sequel, The Bourne Supremacy, which received a similar positive critical and public reception, but received some criticism for its hand-held camerawork, which observers argued made action sequences difficult to see. The Bourne Supremacy was directed by Paul Greengrass with Matt Damon reprising his role as Jason Bourne. A third film, The Bourne Ultimatum, was released in 2007 and again was directed by Paul Greengrass and starred Matt Damon. Like Supremacy, Ultimatum received generally positive critical and public reception, but also received similar criticism for the camera-work. Liman remained as executive producer for both films as well as for the fifth film Jason Bourne, once again directed by Greengrass and released in 2016.

The fourth film of the Bourne franchise, The Bourne Legacy was released in 2012. Neither Damon nor Greengrass was involved.

Damon and Paul Greengrass returned in 2016 for the fifth installment of the series Jason Bourne, directed by Greengrass and written by Greengrass and Christopher Rouse. It is the final film in the Bourne film series and a direct sequel to The Bourne Ultimatum (2007).

See also
 List of films featuring surveillance

References

Further reading
 Tibbetts, John C., and James M. Welsh, eds. The Encyclopedia of Novels Into Film (2nd ed. 2005) pp 39–42.

External links

 
 
 
 
 
 

2002 films
2002 action thriller films
2000s spy films
German action thriller films
American action thriller films
American political thriller films
American spy films
English-language German films
English-language Czech films
2000s chase films
2000s English-language films
Films about amnesia
Bourne (film series)
Films about the Central Intelligence Agency
Films directed by Doug Liman
Films set in 2002
Films set in France
Films set in Liguria
Films set in Paris
Films set in Virginia
Films set in Zürich
Films set in Greece
Films shot in the Czech Republic
Films shot in Greece
Films shot in Italy
Films shot in Paris
Films shot in Rome
Films shot in Switzerland
Films with screenplays by Tony Gilroy
Films about United States Army Special Forces
The Kennedy/Marshall Company films
Universal Pictures films
Films scored by John Powell
2000s American films
2000s German films